is a Japanese football player. He plays for MIO Biwako Shiga. Kosuke Matsuda is his brother.

Playing career
Yusuke Matsuda joined to J3 League club; FC Ryukyu in 2014. In June 2015, he moved to Saurcos Fukui. In 2016, he moved to Tochigi Uva FC.

Club statistics
Updated to 27 February 2018.

References

External links

1991 births
Living people
Kyoto Sangyo University alumni
Association football people from Kyoto Prefecture
Japanese footballers
J3 League players
Japan Football League players
FC Ryukyu players
Tochigi City FC players
MIO Biwako Shiga players
Association football midfielders